Cyril Arthur Halligan (10 November 1886 – 16 May 1942) was a New Zealander who competed for Great Britain at the 1908 Summer Olympics in the 110 metre hurdles. He finished second in his heat but only the winners advanced to the semi-finals.

Halligan won the Scottish 120 yards hurdles title in 1909 and eventually returned to New Zealand where he won the same event in 1915.

References

1886 births
1942 deaths
New Zealand male hurdlers
Athletes (track and field) at the 1908 Summer Olympics
Olympic athletes of Great Britain